Chicha Press (Prensa Chicha in Spanish) is a Peruvian nickname for sensationalist tabloid newspapers that first emerged in the 1980s. The etymology of Chicha Press is derived from the name for certain drinks made from corn, which later came to be used by some in Peru describe the culture of Andean migrants to the capital region of Lima during the 1960s. The concept of the Chicha press became a central part of the national culture in 2000 when it was popularized by Alberto Fujimori to discredit opponents of his government in the general elections of 2000.

Characteristics
These newspapers usually share these features:
 Use slang in headlines and/or news items
 Sometimes portray females in bikinis or partially nude on its front page
 A focus on murders, rapes ("crónica roja") and local show business ("farándula").
 Are designed to appeal to the less educated segment of the Peruvian population.
 Tabloid format (there has never been a full-size chicha newspaper).

List of Chicha newspapers
This is a partial list of Peruvian newspapers considered "prensa chicha": 
"Ajá"
"El Chino" ("El Chino" is Peruvians' nickname for former president Alberto Fujimori)
"El Popular"
"El Trome" (Note: owned by ECO, owner of "El Comercio")
"El Tío"
"El Chato"
"El Men"
"El Mañanero"
"La Chuchi" ("Chuchi" is the name of a TV parody of the ex-congresswoman Susy Díaz)
"Más"
"La Repúdica" (made directly to attack La República)
"Repudio"  (made directly to attack La República)
"El Matadero"
"El Chuculún" (Peruvian slang for sex)

See also
 List of newspapers in Peru
 Media of Peru

Further reading 
 Luque, F. O. The chicha culture: Between ethno-sway and ethno-boomerang: Peruvian subaltern's strategies of resistance and cultural singularity.
 
 
 
 
 
 
 
 
 Casas Navarro, R. (2009). The chicha press: a cognitive analysis. LETRAS, 80(115), 63–85.

References

External links
 "Prensa Chicha" Wikipedia (Spanish language)

Newspapers published in Peru